General Rajendra Chhetri (IAST:rājendra kṣatrī) born 15 November 1960) is a Nepali military officer and former Chief of Army Staff of the Nepalese Army, He was conferred Honorary General of the Indian Army.

Career
Chhetri joined the Nepal Army as a lieutenant on October 24, 1978, and was commissioned into the Rajdal Battalion from Kharipati.
He completed war-college from the United States. He was promoted to major general in November 2011, and to lieutenant general in February 2015.
He assumed office of the Chief of Army Staff on 10 September 2015, following the retirement of General Gaurav Shumsher JB Rana.

Family
He was born in 1960 as the second son of Colonel Gopal Bahadur Khatri Kshatri and Pramila Kshatri in Dudhekuna village, Chok Chisapani VDC of Tanahun District. He is married to Rita Chhetri.

References

|-

Living people
1960 births
Nepalese military personnel
Nepalese generals
People from Tanahun District